Ru is the Mandarin pinyin romanization of the Chinese surname written  in Chinese character. It is romanized Ju in Wade–Giles, and Yuh in Yale (Cantonese). Ru is listed 331st in the Song dynasty classic text Hundred Family Surnames. It is not among the 300 most common surnames in China.

Notable people
 Ru Faliang (茹法亮; 5th century), Southern Qi dynasty official
 Ru Taisu (茹太素; died 1389), Ming dynasty Minister of Revenue
 Ru Chang (茹瑺; died 1409), Ming dynasty Minister of War
 Ru Yun (茹鈗; 1696–?), Qing dynasty general
 Ru Fen (茹棻; 1755–1821), Qing dynasty zhuangyuan and Minister of War
 Ru Zhijuan (茹志鹃; 1925–1998), novelist
 Ru Ping (茹萍; born 1966), actress
 Julian Zhi Jie Yee or Ru Zijie (茹自杰; born 1997), Malaysian figure skater

References

Chinese-language surnames
Individual Chinese surnames